The 1971 Washington Star International – Singles was an event of the 1971 Washington Star International tennis tournament and was played in Washington, D.C., United States from July 12 through July 18, 1971. Cliff Richey was the defending champion but lost in the second round. Ken Rosewall won the singles title, defeating Marty Riessen in the final, 6–2, 7–5, 6–1.

Draw

Finals

Top half

Section 1

Section 2

Bottom half

Section 3

Section 4

References

External links
 ITF tournament edition details

Washington Star International Singles
Washington Star International
Washington Star International